Oliva tessellata, common name the tessellate olive, is a species of sea snail, a marine gastropod mollusk in the family Olividae, the olives.

Description
The length of the shell varies between 15 mm and 60 mm.

Distribution
This marine species occurs in the Eastern Indian Ocean and off Taiwan, New Caledonia and Eastern Australia.

References

External links
 

tessellata
Gastropods described in 1811